Arnesenodden is a headland on Svenskøya in Kong Karls Land, Svalbard. It is the most northern point of Svenskøya, at the foot of the mountain Mohnhøgda. The headland is named after Arctic explorer Magnus Arnesen.

See also
Kapp Hammerfest – the southernmost point of Svenskøya
Kapp Weissenfels – the easternmost point of Svenskøya

References

Headlands of Svalbard
Svenskøya